The Ibis GS-240 is a Colombian homebuilt aircraft that was designed and produced by Ibis Aircraft of Cali. When it was available the aircraft was supplied as a kit for amateur construction.

The GS-240 is no longer offered by the manufacturer as part of their product line.

Design and development
The aircraft was designed as a light-sport aircraft, specifically for the American market and features a strut-braced high-wing, a two-seats-in-side-by-side configuration enclosed cabin accessed via doors, fixed tricycle landing gear with wheel pants and a single engine in tractor configuration.

The aircraft is made from sheet aluminum "all-metal" construction. Its wing is supported by V-stuts and jury struts. The GS-240 was supplied as a quick-build kit, with most major fabrication completed prior to delivery to allow for quick assembly time.

As of April 2017, the design does not appear on the Federal Aviation Administration's list of approved special light-sport aircraft.

Operational history
In May 2014 no examples were registered in the United States with the Federal Aviation Administration.

Specifications (GS-240)

References

External links
Photo of an Ibis GS-240

GS-240
1990s Colombian civil utility aircraft
Single-engined tractor aircraft
High-wing aircraft
Homebuilt aircraft
Light-sport aircraft